Kingswood Villas is a private housing estate in Tin Shui Wai, New Territories, Hong Kong. It has a total of 58 residential blocks and 15,808 units in six phases. It is the first private housing estate in Tin Shui Wai and one of the largest private housing estates in Hong Kong. It was developed by Cheung Kong Holdings from 1991 to 1999.

Phases 
Phase 1: Locwood Court
Phase 2: Sherwood Court
Phase 3: Chestwood Court
Phase 4: Kingswood Ginza
Phase 5: Lynwood Court
Phase 6: Maywood Court
Phase 7: Kenswood Court

Demographics
In the 2016 by-census, the population of the estate was recorded as 39,964. The median age of the residents was 44.4, slightly more than the Hong Kong-wide figure of 43.4.

Transportation 
Light Rail
Locwood stop (for Locwood Court and Sherwood Court)
Chestwood stop (for Chestwood Court)
Tin Wing stop (for Lynwood Court)
Ginza stop (for Maywood Court, Kingswood Court and +WOO)
Residential Service Bus
There are several non-franchised residential bus routes between Kingswood Villas and urban districts, which started operations in 1991. It was originally operated by Citybus. But Citybus decided to withdraw all routes and Kwoon Chung Motors replaced Citybus to operate them in 2006.

References

External links 

Kingswood Villas Official Site
 S.K. Hui, A. Cheung, J. Pang, "A Hierarchical Bayesian Approach for Residential Property Valuation:Application to Hong Kong Housing Market", International Real Estate Review, 2010 Vol. 13 No.1: pp. 1 – 29

Private housing estates in Hong Kong
Tin Shui Wai
CK Hutchison Holdings
1992 establishments in Hong Kong